Race results from the automobile and motorcycle races contested at the Circuit de Monaco in the Principality of Monaco.

Monaco Grand Prix
A pink background indicates an event which was not part of the Formula One World Championship.
A yellow background indicates an event which was part of the pre-war European Championship.

International Formula 3000 Championship

GP2 Series

FIA Formula 2 Championship

GP3

Formula Renault V6 Eurocup

Formula Renault 3.5 Series

Eurocup Formula Renault 2.0

Formula Renault Eurocup

Formula E

Monaco Grand Prix Formula Three

Note: A pink background denotes a Formula Junior race.

Porsche Supercup

BMW M1 Procar Championship

Challenge Intercontinental Jaguar sport XJR-15

Jaguar I-Pace eTrophy

Campionato Italiano Supercar GT

References

Race results at motorsport venues
Race results